Longyangxia (Mandarin: 龙羊峡镇) is a town in Gonghe County, Hainan Tibetan Autonomous Prefecture, Qinghai, China. In 2010, Longyangxia had a total population of 6,578: 3,461 males and 3,117 females: 1,341 aged under 14, 4,869 aged between 15 and 65 and 368 aged over 65.

References 

Township-level divisions of Qinghai
Hainan Tibetan Autonomous Prefecture